Jean Rosario Tétreault (born January 22, 1953) is a Canadian former professional ice hockey player who played in the World Hockey Association (WHA). Drafted in the eighth round of the 1973 NHL Amateur Draft by the St. Louis Blues, Tétreault opted to play in the WHA after being selected by the Vancouver Blazers in the fourth round of the 1973 WHA Amateur Draft. He played parts of two WHA seasons with the Vancouver Blazers and Minnesota Fighting Saints. Tétreault played the role of Andre Bergeron in the 1977 comedy film Slap Shot.

References

External links

1953 births
Canadian ice hockey left wingers
Drummondville Rangers players
Ice hockey people from Quebec
Johnstown Jets players
Living people
Minnesota Fighting Saints players
Montreal Bleu Blanc Rouge players
Montreal Junior Canadiens players
Muskegon Mohawks players
People from Sainte-Thérèse, Quebec
Roanoke Valley Rebels (SHL) players
St. Louis Blues draft picks
Tidewater Sharks players
Vancouver Blazers draft picks
Vancouver Blazers players
Canadian expatriate ice hockey players in the United States